The Dunedin Tailoresses’ Union (DTU) was a trade union in New Zealand from 1889 to 1945. It was New Zealand's first women's union. The union was established on 14 February 1889 by local labour leaders and citizens (all men) of New Zealand who were concerned about conditions and pay for working women and wanted to form a committee to negotiate with employers. Initially, the union was run by men, but in 1891 Maria Selina Hale became its secretary and 13 other women became executives with her. Thereafter, management of this union was quickly controlled by women. It pursued a broad feminist programme, and assisted in the formation of tailoresses’ unions in other centres. This union provided money and an organiser's time to the fledgling Auckland, Wellington and Christchurch tailoresses' unions.

The DTU ceased to exist in June 1945.

See also

References 

1889 establishments in New Zealand
New Zealand Council of Trade Unions
Trade unions in New Zealand